Lucero may refer to:

 Lucero (given name) a Spanish given name
 Lucero (surname) a Spanish surname
 Lucero (entertainer) (born 1969), Mexican singer and actress
 Lucero (album), eponymous album released in 1993
 Lucero (band), an American alt country band
 Lucero (Madrid), a ward (barrio) of Madrid, Spain
 Lucero (Madrid Metro), a station on Line 6
 Lucero sheep, a Criollo sheep breed
 "Lucero", fan-fic short story set in the RP1 fictional universe, by Andy Weir, and canonized into the 2016 edition of Ready Player One
 Cerro del Lucero, mountain in the Province of Granada in southern Spain